Periungual warts are warts that cluster around the fingernail or toenail.  They appear as thickened, fissured cauliflower-like skin around the nail plate.  Periungual warts often cause loss of the cuticle and paronychia. Nail biting increases susceptibility to these warts.

Warts of this kind often cause damage to the nail either by lifting the nail from the skin or causing the nail to partially detach. If they extend under the nail, then the patient may suffer pain as a result. Sometimes periungual wart infections resemble the changes that are found in onychomycosis. In worst cases, if the infection causes injury or damage to the nail matrix, deformity in the nail may become permanent.

As with other wart types, a number of treatments are available, including laser therapy, cryotherapy, salicylic acid, and other topical treatments.

References

Papillomavirus-associated diseases